Baron Manton, of Compton Verney in the County of Warwick, is a title in the Peerage of the United Kingdom. It was created on 25 January 1922 in recognition of war services for the Leeds industrialist Joseph Watson.  the title is held by his great-grandson, the fourth Baron, who succeeded his father in 2003.

The family seat is Houghton Hall, near Market Weighton, Yorkshire.

Barons Manton (1922)
Joseph Watson, 1st Baron Manton (1873–1922)
(George) Miles Watson, 2nd Baron Manton (1899–1968)
(Joseph) Rupert Eric Robert Watson, 3rd Baron Manton (1924–2003)
Miles Ronald Marcus Watson, 4th Baron Manton (b. 1958)

The heir apparent is the present holder's elder son Hon. Thomas Nigel Charles David Watson (b. 1985)

References

Kidd, Charles, Williamson, David (editors). Debrett's Peerage and Baronetage (1990 edition). New York: St Martin's Press, 1990.

Baronies in the Peerage of the United Kingdom
Noble titles created in 1922